DashO is a code obfuscator, compactor, optimizer, watermarker and encryptor for Java, Kotlin and Android applications. It aims to achieve little or no performance loss even as the code complexity increases.

DashO can also statically analyze the code to find unused types, methods, and fields, and delete them, thereby making the application smaller. DashO can delete used methods that are not needed in published applications, such as debugging and logging calls.

See also
 Dotfuscator - a code obfuscator for .NET.
 ProGuard (software) - a code obfuscator for Java.

References

Software obfuscation
Java development tools
Android (operating system) development software